Youssef Ezzejjari Lhasnaoui (born 10 May 1993) is a Spanish-Moroccan professional footballer who plays as a striker for Thai League 1 club Khon Kaen United.

Career
Trained in Catalonia grassroots football, Ezzejjari went through the quarries of clubs such as Badalona, Cornellà and ultimately Manlleu of the División de Honor Juvenil de Fútbol.

The following year, he signed for Granollers of the Third Division of Spain, and in January 2013 signed for Vilassar de Mar. In the summer of 2013 he traveled to England to be part of the combined Nike Football Academy , where he was later on probation to be part of Deportivo Alavés B of the Third Division of Spain, in addition to the Constància of Second Division B of Spain. Finally in March 2014 signed to Mollet UE.

The following seasons played in various regional teams; Gramenet, Avià, Terrassa B,Tona, Mataró and Guineueta.

In the 2019–2020 season, Ezzejjari signed with Oyonesa, where he also became the fifth scorer in group XVI with sixteen goals at the end of the campaign.

CE Carroi
In the summer of 2020, Ezzejjari signed for Andorran Primera Divisió club Carroi for the 2020/2021 season. He made his debut on 30 November, as a starter in a 0–3 defeat to Penya d'Andorra. where he finished as the top scorer in Andorran football with 19 goals. and was also chosen as a forward reference in the first round of the championship. and included in the ideal team of the season in the elite category of Andorran football by the country's sports press.

Persik Kediri
On 21 June 2021, Ezzejjari moved to Indonesia. He signed one-year contract with Indonesian Liga 1 club Persik Kediri. He made his debut on 27 August, as a starter in a 1–0 defeat to Bali United. On 17 September 2021, Ezzejjari scored his first and second goal for Persik in 2021-22 Liga 1, earning them a 2–2 draw over Persikabo 1973. Ezzejjari scored another brace for Persik Kediri in a 2–3 loss against PSM Makassar on 23 September 2021. And against Persipura Jayapura in a 4–2 win on 21 October 2021. Ezzejjari ended his first season at Persik Kediri with 32 appearances and  18 goals in 2021–22 Liga 1.

Bhayangkara
On 3 April 2022, Ezzejjari signed one-year contract with Indonesian Liga 1 club Bhayangkara. On 24 July 2022, he made his debut by starting in a 2–2 draw against Persib Bandung. And he also scored his first goal for the team, he scored in the 37th minute at the Wibawa Mukti Stadium.

References

External links
 
 
 
 
 Youssef Ezzejjari at Federació Andorrana de Futbol 

1993 births
Living people
Spanish people of Moroccan descent
People from Santa Coloma de Gramenet
Sportspeople from the Province of Barcelona
Spanish footballers
Footballers from Barcelona
Association football forwards
Nike Academy players
EC Granollers players
UE Vilassar de Mar players
UDA Gramenet footballers
CE Mataró players
Persik Kediri players
Bhayangkara F.C. players
Primera Catalana players
Tercera División players
Segunda División B players
Primera Divisió players
Liga 1 (Indonesia) players
Spanish expatriate footballers
Moroccan expatriate footballers
Spanish expatriate sportspeople in Andorra
Expatriate footballers in Andorra
Spanish expatriate sportspeople in Indonesia
Expatriate footballers in Indonesia